The Chinese Ambassador to South Africa is the official representative of the People's Republic of China to the Republic of South Africa.

History 
In 1905, a Consul General of the Qing dynasty got Exequatur for Johannesburg.

The majority of the Chinese community in South Africa had contracts with the East Rand Mine.

In 1976, the Republic of China and South Africa opened embassies.

Since 1998, the People's Republic of China and South Africa has recognised each other.

From 1991 to 1997, the People's Republic of China hosted the 'Chinese Center for South African Studies' in Pretoria, headed by a diplomat in the rank of ambassador.

List of representatives

See also
China–South Africa relations
South Africa–Taiwan relations

References 

South Africa
China
Ambassadors